Mulkkusaaret (literally translates to Dick Islands or Penis Islands) is a group of three small islands and one rock in lake Oulujärvi in the Paltamo municipality in Finland.

The islands form a chain in northeast-southwest direction, and are mostly covered by boreal forests. Open cliff coasts can be found on all three islands, mainly on the south sides. There is a campfire site and a shelter, laavu,  on the southernmost island.

Sources

References

Lake islands of Finland
Paltamo
Oulujärvi
Geography of Kainuu